The 1989–90 Coppa Italia was the 43rd edition of the Coppa Italia, a domestic cup competition held by the Italian Football Federation. It was won by Juventus, who defeated Milan in the final.

Preliminary round

First round

Second round

Group stage

Group 1 

Results

Roma advanced with the draw.

Group 2 

Results

Group 3 

Results

Group 4 

Results

Semi-finals

First leg

Second leg

Final

First leg

Second leg

Juventus won 1–0 on aggregate.

Top goalscorers

References
rsssf.com

Coppa Italia seasons
Coppa Italia
Coppa Italia